Calavino (Calavin in local dialect) was a comune (municipality) in Trentino in the northern Italian region Trentino-Alto Adige/Südtirol, located about  west of Trento. It was merged with Lasino to form a new municipality, Madruzzo.

Calavino borders the following municipalities: San Lorenzo in Banale, Trento, Vezzano, Padergnone, Lomaso, Lasino and Dro.

Demographic evolution

References

External links
 Homepage of the city

Cities and towns in Trentino-Alto Adige/Südtirol